Perillartine, also known as perillartin and perilla sugar, is a semisynthetic sweetener that is about 2000 times as sweet as sucrose. It is mainly used in Japan.
Perillartine is the oxime of perillaldehyde, which is extracted from plants of the genus Perilla (Lamiaceae).

See also 

 Sweetener
 Oxime
 Perilla
 Shiso
 Oxime V

References

External links

Aldoximes
Sugar substitutes
Monoterpenes
Cyclohexenes